"Hope" is a song by Canadian rock band Our Lady Peace. It was the third single released from their debut 1994 album, Naveed. It was included on the compilation album 10 of Modern Rock's Best...

Origin
When first being recorded, the song was titled "Sunflower" and had a psychedelic style, and, according to Jeremy Taggart, a Police vibe out of the bridge.

Music video
The music video for the song shows the band playing in a smoky bar. It switches back and forth to a woman in a sunflower field who seems lost. It shows her and another man doing various unusual things.

References

External links

1994 singles
Our Lady Peace songs
Songs written by Raine Maida
1994 songs
Epic Records singles